Michael Carter is an American guitarist, songwriter, and record producer, known for his work with Luke Bryan and Cole Swindell.

Carter is Bryan's lead guitarist and bandleader. He and Swindell, a former merchandise vendor of Bryan's, co-wrote Craig Campbell's "Outta My Head", Thomas Rhett's "Get Me Some of That", Swindell's "Hope You Get Lonely Tonight", and Bryan's "Roller Coaster".
Carter also produced Swindell's self-titled debut album.

References

Year of birth missing (living people)
American country guitarists
American male guitarists
American country singer-songwriters
American country record producers
Country musicians from Georgia (U.S. state)
Living people
People from Sylvester, Georgia
Guitarists from Georgia (U.S. state)
American male singer-songwriters
Singer-songwriters from Georgia (U.S. state)